The 2020–21 Stephen F. Austin Lumberjacks basketball team represented Stephen F. Austin State University (SFA) during the 2020–21 NCAA Division I men's basketball season. The Lumberjacks, led by fifth-year head coach Kyle Keller, played home games at the William R. Johnson Coliseum in Nacogdoches, Texas.  This season was the Lumberjacks' last as members of the Southland Conference; SFA is one of four schools, all from Texas, that will leave the Southland in July 2021 to join the Western Athletic Conference.

Previous season
The 2019–20 Stephen F. Austin Lumberjacks basketball team finished the season 28–3, 19–1 in Southland play to win the Southland regular season championship. As the No. 1 seed, they received a double-bye to the semifinals of the Southland tournament, however, the tournament was cancelled amid the COVID-19 pandemic. With the Southland tournament's cancellation, they were awarded the Southland's automatic bid to the NCAA tournament, however, the NCAA tournament was also cancelled due to the same outbreak.

Roster

Schedule 

|-
!colspan=12 style=| Non-conference Regular season

|-
!colspan=12 style=| Southland Regular season

Source:

References 

Stephen F. Austin
Stephen F. Austin Lumberjacks basketball seasons
Stephen F. Austin Lumberjacks basketball
Stephen F. Austin Lumberjacks basketball